Varian Mackey Fry (October 15, 1907 – September 13, 1967) was an American journalist. Fry ran a rescue network in Vichy France that helped approximately 2,000 to 4,000 anti-Nazi and Jewish refugees to escape Nazi Germany and the Holocaust. He was the first of five Americans to be recognized as "Righteous Among the Nations", an honorific given by the State of Israel to non-Jews who risked their lives to save Jews during the Holocaust.

Early life

Fry was born in New York City. His parents were Lillian (Mackey) and Arthur Fry, a manager of the Wall Street firm Carlysle and Mellick. The family moved to Ridgewood, New Jersey, in 1910. He grew up in Ridgewood and enjoyed bird-watching and reading. During World War I, at 9 years of age, Fry and friends conducted a fund-raising bazaar for the American Red Cross that included a vaudeville show, an ice cream stand and fish pond. He was educated at Hotchkiss School from 1922 to 1924, when he left the school due to hazing rituals. He then attended the Riverdale Country School, graduating in 1926.

An able, multi-lingual student, Fry scored in the top 10% on the entrance exams to Harvard University and, while a Harvard undergraduate, founded Hound & Horn, an influential literary quarterly, in 1927 with Lincoln Kirstein. He was suspended for a prank just before graduation and had to repeat his senior year. Through Kirstein's sister, Mina, he met his future wife, Eileen Avery Hughes, an editor of Atlantic Monthly, who was seven years his senior and had been educated at Roedean School and Oxford University. They married on June 2, 1931.

Journalist
While working as a foreign correspondent for the American journal The Living Age, Fry visited Berlin in 1935, and personally witnessed Nazi abuse against Jews on more than one occasion, which "turned him into an ardent anti-Nazi". He said in 1945, "I could not remain idle as long as I had any chances at all of saving even a few of its intended victims."

Following his visit to Berlin, Fry wrote about the savage treatment of Jews by Hitler's regime in The New York Times in 1935. He wrote books about foreign affairs for Headline Books, owned by the Foreign Policy Association, including The Peace that Failed. It describes the troubled political climate following World War I, the break-up of Czechoslovakia and the events leading up to World War II.

Emergency Rescue Committee

Greatly disturbed by what he saw, Fry helped raise money to support European anti-Nazi movements. Shortly after the invasion of France in June 1940, which the Germans quickly occupied, Fry and his friends formed the Emergency Rescue Committee (ERC), with support of First Lady Eleanor Roosevelt and others. By August 1940, Fry was in Marseille representing the ERC in an effort to help persons wishing to flee the Nazis, and circumvent the processes by French authorities who would not issue exit visas. Fry had $3,000 and a short list of refugees under imminent threat of arrest by agents of the Gestapo, mostly Jews. Clamoring at his door came anti-Nazi writers, avant-garde artists, musicians and hundreds of others desperately seeking any chance to escape France.

Some historians later noted it was a miracle that a white American Protestant would risk everything to help the Jews.

Beginning in 1940, in Marseille, despite the watchful eye of the collaborationist Vichy regime, Fry and a small group of volunteers hid people at the Villa Air-Bel until they could be smuggled out. More than 2,200 people were taken across the border to Spain and then to the safety of neutral Portugal from which they made their way to the United States. 

Fry helped other exiles escape on ships leaving Marseille for the French colony of Martinique, from where they could also go to the United States. Among Fry's closest associates were Americans Miriam Davenport, a former art student at the Sorbonne, and the heiress Mary Jayne Gold, a lover of the arts and the "good life" who had come to Paris in the early 1930s.

When the Nazis seized France in 1940, Gold went to Marseille, where she worked with Fry and helped finance his operation. Also working with Fry was a young academic named Albert O. Hirschman.

Especially instrumental in getting Fry the visas he needed for the artists, intellectuals and political dissidents on his list, was Hiram Bingham IV, an American Vice Consul in Marseille who fought against anti-Semitism in the State Department and was personally responsible for issuing thousands of visas, both legal and illegal. He was also helped in his mission by Alfred Barr, Museum Director at the MoMa and his wife Margaret Scolari Barr art historian also working at the MoMA.

From his isolated position in Marseille, Fry relied on the Unitarian Service Committee in Lisbon to help the refugees he sent. This office, staffed by American Unitarians under the direction of Robert Dexter, helped refugees to wait in safety for visas and other necessary papers, and to gain passage by sea from Lisbon.

Fry was forced to leave France in September 1941 after officials both of the Vichy government and of the United States State Department had become angered by his covert activities. In 1942, the Emergency Rescue Committee and the American branch of the European-based International Relief Association joined forces under the name the International Relief and Rescue Committee, which was later shortened to the International Rescue Committee (IRC). The IRC is a leading nonsectarian, nongovernmental international relief and development organization that still operates today.

Refugees aided by Fry
Among those Fry aided were:

Hannah Arendt
Jean Arp
Hans Aufricht
Hans Bellmer
Georg Bernhard
Victor Brauner
André Breton
Camille Bryen
De Castro
Marc Chagall
Frédéric Delanglade
Óscar Domínguez
Marcel Duchamp
Heinrich Ehrmann
Max Ernst
Edvard Fendler
Lion Feuchtwanger
Leonhard Frank
Giuseppe Garetto
Oscar Goldberg
Emil Julius Gumbel
Hans Habe
Jacques-Salomon Hadamard
Konrad Heiden
Jacques Hérold
Wilhelm Herzog
Erich Itor Kahn
Fritz Kahn
Berthold Jacob
Heinz Jolles
Arthur Koestler
Siegfried Kracauer
Wifredo Lam
Jacqueline Lamba
Wanda Landowska
Lotte Leonard
Claude Lévi-Strauss
Jacques Lipchitz
Alberto Magnelli
Alma Mahler Gropius Werfel
Jean Malaquais
Bohuslav Martinů
Golo Mann
Heinrich Mann
Valeriu Marcu
André Masson
Roberto Matta
Walter Mehring
Alfredo Mendizabel
Otto Meyerhof
Boris Mirkine-Guetzevitch
Hans Namuth
Hans Natonek
Ernst-Erich Noth
Max Ophüls
Hertha Pauli
Benjamin Péret
Alfred Polgar
Poliakoff-Litovzeff
Peter Pringsheim
Denise Restout
Hans Sahl
Jacques Schiffrin
Anna Seghers
Victor Serge
Ferdinand Springer
Fred Stein
Bruno Strauss
Sophie Taeuber
Remedios Varo
Franz Werfel
Kurt Wolff and Helen Wolff
Wols (Alfred Otto Wolfgang Schulze)
Ylla (Camilla Koffler)

Back in the United States

Fry wrote and spoke critically against U.S. immigration policies particularly relating to the fate of Jews in Europe. In a December 1942 issue of The New Republic, he wrote a scathing article titled: "The Massacre of Jews in Europe".

Although by 1942 Fry had been terminated from his position at the Emergency Rescue Committee, American private rescuers acknowledged that his program in France had been uniquely effective, and recruited him in 1944 to provide behind-the-scenes guidance to the Roosevelt administration's late-breaking rescue program, the War Refugee Board.

Fry published a book in 1945 about his time in France under the title Surrender on Demand, first published by Random House, 1945. (Its title refers to the 1940 French-German armistice clause requiring France to hand over to German authorities any refugee from "Greater Germany" the Gestapo might identify, a requirement Fry routinely violated.) A later edition was published by Johnson Books, in 1997, in conjunction with the U.S. Holocaust Museum. In 1968, the US publisher Scholastic (which markets mainly to children and adolescents) published a paperback edition under the title Assignment: Rescue.

After the war, Fry worked as a journalist, magazine editor and business writer. He also taught college and was in film production. Feeling as if he had lived the peak of his life in France, he developed ulcers. Fry went into psychoanalysis and said that "as time went on, he grew more and more troubled."

Fry and his wife Eileen divorced after he returned from France. She developed cancer and died on May 12, 1948. During her hospital convalescence, Fry visited her and read to her daily. At the end of 1948 or early 1949, Fry met Annette Riley, who was 16 years his junior. They married in 1950, had three children together, but were separated in 1966, possibly owing to his irrational behavior, believed to have been a result of manic depression.

Fry died of a cerebral hemorrhage and was found dead in his bed on September 13, 1967, by the Connecticut State Police. He was buried at Green-Wood Cemetery, Brooklyn, New York with his parents.

Fry's papers are held in Columbia University's Rare Book and Manuscript Library.

Published works
Author
 "A Bibliography of the Writings of Thomas Stearns Eliot". Hound & Horn, 1928.
 Assignment  Rescue: An Autobiography. Madison, Wisconsin: Demco, 1992. .
 Bricks Without Mortar: The Story of International Cooperation. New York: Foreign Policy Association, 1938. .
 Headline Books. New York: Foreign Policy Association, 1938.
 Surrender on Demand. New York: Random House, 1945.  
 The Peace that Failed: How Europe Sowed the Seeds of War. New York: Foreign Policy Association, 1939. 
 To Whom it May Concern. 1947.
 War in China: America's Role in the Far East. New York: Foreign Policy Association, 1938. 

Co-author
 Fry, Varian and Emil Herlin. War Atlas: A Handbook of Maps and Facts. New York: Foreign Policy Association, 1940. .
 Goetz,  Delia and Varian Fry. The Good Neighbours: The Story of the Two Americas. The Foreign Policy Association, 1939. 
 Popper, David H., Shepard Stone and Varian Fry. The puzzle of Palestine. New York: Foreign Policy Association, 1938.
 Wolfe, Henry Cutler, James Frederick Green, Stoyan Pribichevich, Varian Fry, William V. Reed, Elizabeth Ogg and Emil Herlin, Spotlight on the Balkans. New York: Foreign Policy Association, 1940.

Legacy

 1967 - The government of France recognized Fry's contribution to freedom with the Legion of Honor.
 1980 - Mary Jayne Gold's 1980 book titled Crossroads Marseilles 1940 sparked an interest in Fry and his heroic efforts.
 1991 - The United States Holocaust Memorial Council awarded Fry the Eisenhower Liberation Medal.
 1994 - Fry became the first United States citizen to be listed in the Righteous Among the Nations at Israel's national Holocaust Memorial, award by Yad Vashem.
 1997 - Irish film director David Kerr made a documentary entitled Varian Fry: The America's Schindler that was narrated by actor Sean Barrett.
 1998 - Fry was awarded the "Commemorative Citizenship of the State of Israel" on January 1, 1998.
 2001 - Fry's story was also told in dramatic form in the 2001 made-for-television film Varian's War, written and directed by Lionel Chetwynd and starring William Hurt and Julia Ormond.
 2002 - On the initiative of Samuel V. Brock, the U.S. Consul General in Marseille from 1999 to 2002, the square in front of the consulate was renamed Place Varian Fry.
 2005 - A street in the newly reconstructed East/West Berlin Wall area in the Berlin borough of Mitte at Potsdamer Platz was named Varian-Fry-Straße in recognition of his work.
 2005 - A street in his home town of Ridgewood, New Jersey, was renamed Varian Fry Way.
 2007 - On October 15, 2007, the U.S. House of Representatives honored Varian Fry on the 100th anniversary of his birth.
2019 - Julie Orringer's historical novel The Flight Portfolio is a fictionalized account of Fry's life and experiences in Marseille, which merges real events and historical characters with invented elements. The invented elements include a clandestine love affair and intrigue surrounding the plot to rescue a fictional young physics genius.

See also
 Charles Fernley Fawcett
 Chiune Sugihara
 List of Righteous among the Nations by country
 Sousa Mendes Foundation

References

Notes

Bibliography

 Gold, Mary Jayne. Crossroads Marseilles, 1940. New York: Doubleday, 1980. .
 Grunwald-Spier, Agnes. The Other Schindlers: Why Some People Chose to Save Jews in the Holocaust. Stroud, Gloucestershire, UK: The History Press, 2010. .
 Isenberg, Sheila. A Hero of Our Own: The Story of Varian Fry. Bloomington, Indiana: iUniverse, 2005. .
 McCabe, Cynthia Jaffee. "Wanted by the Gestapo: Saved by America – Varian Fry and the Emergency Rescue Committee", pp. 79–91 in Jackman, Jarrell C. and Carla M. Borden, eds. The Musses Flee Hitler: Cultural Transfer and Adaptation 1930-1945. Washington, D.C.:  (Smithsonian, 1983.
Marino, Andy. A Quiet American: The Secret War of Varian Fry. New York: St. Martin's Press, 1999. .
 Mattern, Joanne. Life Stories of 100 American Heroes. Vancouver: KidsBooks, 2001. .
 Mauthner, Martin. German Writers in French Exile, 1933-1940. London: Vallentine Mitchell, 2007, .
 McClafferty, Carla Killough. In Defiance of Hitler: The Secret Mission of Varian Fry. New York: Farrar, Straus and Giroux (BYR), 2008. .
 Moulin, Pierre. Dachau, Holocaust, and US Samurais: Nisei Soldiers First in Dachau?. Bloomington, Indiana: AuthorHouse, 2007. . 
 Paldiel, Mordecai. Saving the Jews: Men and Women who Defied the Final Solution. Lanham, Maryland: Taylor Trade Publications, 2011. .
 Richards, Tad. The Virgil Directive. New York: Fawcett, 1982. .
 Riding, Alan. And the Show Went On: Cultural Life in Nazi-occupied Paris. New York: Knopf Doubleday Publishing Group, 2010. .
 Roth, John K. and Elisabeth Maxwell. Remembering for the Future: The Holocaust in an Age of Genocide. London: Palgrave, 2001. .
 Schwertfeger, Ruth. In Transit: Narratives of German Jews in Exile, Flight, and Internment During 'The Dark Years' of France. Berlin, Germany: Frank & Timme GmbH, 2012. .
 Sogos, Giorgia. "Varian Fry: „Der Engel von Marseille“. Von der Legalität in die Illegalität und zur Rehabilitierung", in Gabriele Anderl, Simon Usaty (Hrsg.). "Schleppen, schleusen, helfen. Flucht zwischen Rettung und Ausbeutung". Wien: Mandelbaum,2016, S. 209–220, .
 Strempel, Rüdiger, Letzter Halt Marseille - Varian Fry und das Emergency Rescue Committee, in Clasen, Winrich C.-W./Schneemelcher, W. Peter, eds, Mittelmeerpassagen, Rheinbach 2018,   
 Subak, Susan Elisabeth. Rescue and Flight: American Relief Workers Who Defied the Nazis. Lincoln, Nebraska: University of Nebraska Press, 2010. .
 Sullivan, Rosemary. Villa Air-Bel. New York: HarperCollins, 2006. .
 Watson, Peter. The German Genius: Europe's Third Renaissance, the Second Scientific Revolution and the Twentieth Century. New York: Simon & Schuster, 2010. .

External links
 Varian Fry Institute
 Varian Fry from the Varian Fry Foundation Project/IRC
 A Tribute to Varian Fry from Holocaust Survivors and Remembrance Project
 Varian Fry, The American Schindler by Louis Bülow
 Varian Fry, his activity to save Jews' lives during the Holocaust, at Yad Vashem website
Finding aid to the Varian Fry papers at Columbia University Rare Book & Manuscript Library

American humanitarians
American male journalists
20th-century American journalists
American Righteous Among the Nations
American Protestants
Journalists from New York City
Protestant Righteous Among the Nations
Hotchkiss School alumni
Harvard University alumni
People from Ridgefield, Connecticut
1907 births
1967 deaths
20th-century American non-fiction writers
20th-century American male writers
Riverdale Country School alumni
Burials at Green-Wood Cemetery